The Western Australia Police Pipe Band (WAPOL) is an Australian competitive pipe band organization based in Perth, Western Australia associated with the Western Australia Police.

History
 
The original Western Australia Police Band was a brass band between 1902 and 1925. The WA Police Pipe Band, now commonly known as and referred to as WAPOL, was formed in 1966.

The band won the Grade 2 title at the World Pipe Band Championships in 1998, and was promoted to Grade 1 at the end of the season. It is currently the only Australian competitive pipe band, sanctioned in competition by the Western Australia Police.

At the World Championships in 2004 the band qualified for the final and came 11th overall.

, WAPOL are the current Australian and South Pacific Grade 1 champions, having won this biennial national competition in 2012 and 2014 and are also the reigning WA Grade 1 Champions.

In 2004, the WA Police allowed civilians to become members of the police pipe band alongside officers, and as of 2019, most members of the WA Police pipe band are civilians, and therefore not police officers.

In 2020, the band made the decision to form a youth development program to encourage local interest in learning bagpipes and Scottish drumming.

Pipe majors 

 James Murray (2012-2019)
 Stuart Robertson (Acting 2019-2020)
 Alisdair McLaren (2020–2022)
 Chris McDonald  (2022-present)

Leading drummers 

 Gary Potter (2017-2020)
 David Johnston (2020–2021)
 Gary Potter (2021-present)

Discography
Seolauh Ur (1996)
Music of the Gael (1998)
Off Duty (2000)

References

External links

Musical groups established in 1902
Musical groups established in 1966
Grade 1 pipe bands
Culture of Western Australia
Australian police bands